Bardsey, West Yorkshire, England is a small village in the City of Leeds metropolitan borough,  north east of Leeds city centre. The village is in the LS17 Leeds postcode district. It is part of the civil parish of Bardsey cum Rigton. The village itself lies just off the A58 road between Leeds and Wetherby.

It is a predominantly middle class area with a high proportion of retired residents.  Housing is mixed; while most is private, there is council housing situated near Keswick Lane.  Facilities include a public house and sports club (with a cricket pitch and two football pitches).  Bardsey also has a primary school and an Anglican church.

Etymology
The name of Bardsey is first attested in the Domesday Book of 1086 as Berdesei and Bereleseie, situated in the hundred of Skyrack. The second element comes from the Old English word ēg ('island') and the first is agreed to be from a personal name. Exactly what this name was is not certain, but the name Beornrǣd is a plausible candidate. Thus the name probably once meant 'Beornrǣd's island' (or the island of someone of a similar name). Since the site is not in fact an island, it has been suggested that the name was metaphorical, referring to a hill rising, island-like, from flat ground.

History 

Nearby earthworks named Pompocali, in the parish of Scarcroft, are of uncertain origin, but possibly a result of quarrying. A minor Roman road lies alongside it, suggesting that Pompocali results from Roman activity.

A motte-and-bailey castle dates back to the time immediately following the Norman conquest.

The Bingley Arms is a public house that claims to be England's oldest public house, and to be recorded in the Domesday Book, although these claims are disputed.

Bardsey railway station on the Cross Gates–Wetherby line opened in 1876 and closed in 1964.

Location grid

See also
Listed buildings in Bardsey cum Rigton

References

External links

  The Corpus of Romanesque Sculpture in Britain and Ireland: All Hallows, Bardsey, West Yorkshire
  Bardsey Village web-site
  Bardsey Cricket Club website
 

Villages in West Yorkshire
Places in Leeds